Obsession is an album by Eighteen Visions. The album was their most commercially successful to date, and featured three music videos. Some editions of this album come with a DVD that features a 'making of' the album. The album has sold over 200,000 copies in the US. The album peaked at #4 on the Heatseekers chart in the US. On July 3, 2004 the album peaked at #147 on the Billboard 200.  The song "Guilty Pleasures," seemingly only available on the UK Pressing of Obsession, was confirmed by singer James Hart on Twitter to actually be "The Sun Falls Down."  The title is incorrect on the Japan pressings and the single for "I Let Go."

The album was noted to be a starkly different sonic approach by comparison to the sound found on their earlier work, noted by AllMusic as "[a] shadowy realm [...] where the iron poles of heavy metal beat against hardcore spines, and hammer the resulting screams into melodies lanced with pain."

Track listings

US pressing
"Obsession" (2:03)
"I Let Go" (3:23)
"Crushed" (3:00)
"This Time" (3:05)
"Tower of Snakes" (3:41)
"I Should Tell You" (3:47)
"Waiting for the Heavens" (3:43)
"Lost in a Dream" (3:07)
"Bleed by Yourself" (3:20)
"A Long Way Home" (2:34)
"Said and Done" (4:00)

UK pressing
"Obsession" (2:03)
"I Let Go" (3:23)
"Crushed" (3:00)
"This Time" (3:05)
"Tower of Snakes" (3:38)
"I Should Tell You" (3:45)
"Waiting for the Heavens" (3:41)
"A Pretty Blue (Lost in a Dream)" (3:07)
"Guilty Pleasures (The Sun Falls Down)" (3:15)
"Bleed by Yourself" (3:18)
"The World Is Mine" (2:57)
"A Long Way Home" (2:34)
"Said and Done" (3:58)

Japanese pressing
"Obsession" (2:03)
"I Let Go" (3:23)
"Crushed" (3:00)
"This Time" (3:05)
"Tower of Snakes" (3:38)
"I Should Tell You" (3:45)
"Waiting for the Heavens" (3:41)
"Lost in a Dream" (3:07)
"Bleed by Yourself" (3:18)
"A Long Way Home" (2:34)
"Said and Done" (3:58)
"The World Is Mine" (2:57)
"Guilty Pleasures (The Sun Falls Down)" (3:15)

Personnel
James Hart - lead vocals
Keith Barney - lead guitar, piano, lap steel, vocals
Mick Morris - bass
Ken Floyd - drums, percussion, keyboard, programming, guitars, vocals

References

External links
 Obsession Album Website
 Obsession on Trustkill Records

Eighteen Visions albums
2004 albums
Trustkill Records albums